Bayraktar is a Turkish surname and word that consists of the Turkish word “bayrak (/bɑɪrɑq/)” for flag and Persian suffix "دار(/dɑːr/)", literally meaning flag-owner or "flag-bearer".

People
Notable people with the surname or epithet include:

Bajraktari
 Muharrem Bajraktari (1896–1989), Albanian Muslim guerrilla fighter and political figure

Bayraktar
 Alemdar Mustafa Pasha (died 1808), also known as Bayraktar Mustafa Pasha, Ottoman grand vizier
 Erdoğan Bayraktar (born 1948), Turkish politician and former government minister
 Gülşen Bayraktar (born 1976), Turkish pop singer
 Hakan Bayraktar (born 1976), Turkish footballer
 Sami Bayraktar (born 1978), Turkish-Belgian futsal player
 Selçuk Bayraktar (born 1979), Turkish UAV engineer and businessman
 Selim Bayraktar (born 1975), Turkish actor
 Ufukhan Bayraktar (born 1986), Turkish footballer
 Uluç Bayraktar (born 1974), Turkish film director

See also
 Alemdar

Turkish-language surnames